Saul Amsterdam (17 March 1898, Nowy Sącz – 1 November 1937), also known as Gustaw Henrykowski, was a Polish communist activist, a lawyer by profession. Initially, a member of the Poale Zion 1918–1921, and from 1923, a member of the Central Committee of the Communist Party of Poland (KPP). Between 1933-1934 Amsterdam was a member of the Politburo of the Central Committee of the KPP. He also was a journalist and involved in the activities of the Communist International.

Amsterdam was executed in the Great Purge in Moscow in 1937.

References

1898 births
1937 deaths
People from Nowy Sącz
People from the Kingdom of Galicia and Lodomeria
Austro-Hungarian Jews
Jews from Galicia (Eastern Europe)
Communist Party of Poland politicians
Jewish socialists
Jews executed by the Soviet Union
Polish Operation of the NKVD
Great Purge victims from Poland